Chirakkal railway station (code: CQL) is a railway station in Kannur district, Kerala, and falls under the Palakkad railway division of the Southern Railway zone, Indian Railways.

Railway stations in Kannur district
Railway stations opened in 1904
1904 establishments in India